Richard David Wilkins (born June 4, 1967) is an American former professional baseball catcher. He played 11 seasons in Major League Baseball (MLB) between 1991 and 2001 for the Chicago Cubs, Houston Astros, San Francisco Giants, Seattle Mariners, New York Mets, Los Angeles Dodgers, St. Louis Cardinals, and San Diego Padres.

Early life
Wilkins was born in Jacksonville, Florida.  While growing up, he graduated from The Bolles School where he was a district champ in both baseball and football his senior year of high school in 1985. Received an athletic scholarship from Furman University.

Baseball career
Rick was selected in the 23rd round by the Chicago Cubs in the 1986 Major League Baseball Draft. Prior to his call to the big leagues Wilkins was rated the 70th best prospect by Baseball America and at the age of 24 he made his major league debut on June 6, 1991. By 1993 he was named the opening day catcher of the Chicago Cubs where he played in 136 games while posting a  batting average .303 and clubbing 30 homeruns along with 73 RBIs making him the 4th member of the .300/30 club for catchers in Major League Baseball history. Since then 5 more members have made the elusive club. On October 3, 2001, Wilkins ended his professional playing career going 1 for 1 with 2 RBIs with the San Diego Padres.

References

External links

Major League Baseball catchers
Chicago Cubs players
Houston Astros players
Furman Paladins baseball players
Seattle Mariners players
San Francisco Giants players
New York Mets players
Los Angeles Dodgers players
St. Louis Cardinals players
San Diego Padres players
Baseball players from Jacksonville, Florida
1967 births
Living people
Geneva Cubs players
Peoria Chiefs players
Winston-Salem Spirits players
Charlotte Knights players
Iowa Cubs players
Jackson Generals (Texas League) players
Tucson Toros players
Tacoma Rainiers players
Norfolk Tides players
Albuquerque Dukes players
Memphis Redbirds players
Portland Beavers players
Joliet JackHammers players
Bolles School alumni
FSC Jacksonville Blue Wave baseball players